The following are public holidays in the Cook Islands as prescribed by the Public Holidays Act in 1999. Each Sunday is also a public holiday, as most Cook Islanders follow the Christian religion, with over half of the population registered as members of the Cook Islands Christian Church.

Also, the regions observe the following regional holidays.  Most of the populated islands celebrate their own Gospel Days:

References

Cook Islands
Cook Islands law
Cook Islands culture
Public holidays in Oceania